Tomáš Rigo (born 3 July 2002) is a Slovak professional footballer who plays as a midfielder for Sellier & Bellot Vlašim on loan from SK Slavia Prague.

Career
Rigo made his professional debut with Slavia Prague in a 5–0 UEFA Europa League loss to Bayer 04 Leverkusen on 12 October 2020. On 28 January 2021, Rigo signed a professional contract with Slavia Prague for four years.

International career
Rigo represented the Slovakia U18s in 2018.

References

External links
 
 Slavia Profile
 Idnes Profile
 SN Profile

2002 births
Living people
Sportspeople from Poprad
Slovak footballers
Slovakia youth international footballers
Association football midfielders
SK Slavia Prague players
FC Sellier & Bellot Vlašim players
Czech First League players
Czech National Football League players
Slovak expatriate footballers
Slovak expatriate sportspeople in the Czech Republic
Expatriate footballers in the Czech Republic